The Maltese national beach soccer team is the representative team for Malta in international beach soccer competitions. It is coordinated and regulated by the Malta Football Association, the governing body for football in Malta.

Malta made their international competitive debut at the 2015 Mediterranean Beach Games. The former coach of Hungary, Massimiliano De Celis, was the manager during the 2015 tournament, but left the post after the end of the competition.

Current squad
As of September 2015

Achievements
 Mediterranean Beach Games Best: 11th place
 2015

Competitive record

Mediterranean Beach Games

Sources

Squad
Results

European national beach soccer teams
Beach Soccer